Yoo-kyung is a Korean feminine given name. Its meaning differs based on the hanja used to write each syllable of the name. There are 62 hanja with the reading "yu" and 54 hanja with the reading "kyung" on the South Korean government's official list of hanja which may be used in given names.

People with this name include:
Jung Yoo-kyung (born 1968), South Korean television screenwriter
Kim Yoo-kyung (born 1975), South Korean rhythmic gymnast
Klara Min (born Min Yu-kyoung, c. 1976), South Korean pianist
Hong Yoo-kyung (born 1994), South Korean singer and dancer

Fictional characters with this name include:
Jung Yoo-kyung, in 2006 South Korean television series Alone in Love
Seo Yoo-kyung, in 2010 South Korean television series Pasta

See also
List of Korean given names

References

Korean feminine given names